Travis Randall McDonough (born 1972) is the Chief United States district judge of the United States District Court for the Eastern District of Tennessee and former chief of staff and counselor to the mayor of Chattanooga, Tennessee.

Biography

McDonough was raised in Powell's Crossroads in Marion County, Tennessee, and graduated from Whitwell High School.  He received a Bachelor of Arts degree in 1994 from Sewanee: The University of the South, where he was named a Harry S Truman scholar. He received a Juris Doctor in 1997 from Vanderbilt University Law School. He served as an associate at the Chattanooga, Tennessee law firm of Miller & Martin, from 1997 to 2004, and as a partner at that firm from 2005 to 2013, additionally serving as head of the firm's litigation department from 2012 to 2013. During his service at that firm, he litigated a wide variety of civil and criminal matters in Federal and State courts. From 2013 to 2015, he served as Chief of Staff and Counselor to the Chattanooga Mayor Andy Berke.

Federal judicial service
On November 20, 2014, President Barack Obama nominated McDonough to serve as a United States District Judge of the United States District Court for the Eastern District of Tennessee, to the seat vacated by Judge Curtis Lynn Collier, who assumed senior status on October 31, 2014. On December 16, 2014 his nomination was returned to the President due to the sine die adjournment of the 113th Congress. On January 7, 2015, President Obama renominated him to the same position. He received a hearing before the Senate Judiciary Committee  on June 10, 2015. On July 9, 2015 his nomination was reported out of committee by a voice vote. On December 7, 2015 the United States Senate  confirmed his nomination by a 89–0 vote. He received his judicial commission on December 10, 2015. He became Chief Judge on September 10, 2020 following the death of Pamela L. Reeves.

References

External links

1972 births
Living people
Judges of the United States District Court for the Eastern District of Tennessee
People from Chattanooga, Tennessee
Sewanee: The University of the South alumni
Political chiefs of staff
Tennessee lawyers
United States district court judges appointed by Barack Obama
21st-century American judges
Vanderbilt University Law School alumni